Eilean Chathastail (Eng: Castle Island) is one of the Small Isles in the Inner Hebrides of Scotland.

Geography

Eilean Chathastail protects the only harbour on Eigg at Galmisdale. Eigg lighthouse was built on the island in 1906 by brothers David A. and Charles Alexander Stevenson.

History
In July 1884 the geologist and writer Hugh Miller arrived at the Eilean Chathastail anchorage on board the yacht Betsey. He had just begun his journey at Tobermory and he produced a diary of his travels in the Hebrides for the newspaper Witness, of which he was the editor. His contributions were later collated and published as The Cruise of the Betsey in 1856.

He wrote that: "We passed the Isle of Muck, with its one low hill; saw the pyramidal mountains of Rum looming tall in the offing; and then, running along the Isle of Eigg, with its colossal Scuir rising between us and the sky, as if it were a piece of Babylonian wall, or the great wall of China, only vastly larger, set down on the ridge of a mountain, we entered the channel which separates the isle from one of its dependencies, Eilean Chathastail, and cast anchor in the tideway."

Robert Lawrie Thomson, a former laird of Eigg, is buried at the southern end of Eilean Chathastail. This is marked by a burial enclosure on Maol an Eilean, the island's highest point.

See also

 List of islands of Scotland

Notes

References

 Bray, Elizabeth (1996) The Discovery of the Hebrides: Voyages to the Western Isles 1745-1883. Edinburgh. Birlinn.

External links

Uninhabited islands of Highland (council area)
Small Isles, Lochaber